"Blood // Water" is a single by Canadian musician Grandson. The single was released on 27 October 2017 through Fueled By Ramen. The song is the lead single off of Grandson's first extended play, A Modern Tragedy Vol. 1.

Background 
The official audio video was released on Grandson's YouTube channel on October 27, 2017.

Composition and lyrics 
Gil Kaufman described the song as a "pop-spiked take on Rage Against the Machine's activist rap-rock". The song is performed in an G-sharp minor with an 11A
Camelot mixing. The song has a tempo of 154 beats per minute.

In a May 2019 interview with Radio.com, Grandson described the lyrics of "Blood // Water" as "the first shot from a personal revolution, and it has been growing ever since. In the grand raw tradition of activist rock, grandson cut through the chaotic culture, urging people to pay attention."

Live performances 
On August 15, 2018, the first live television performance of "Blood // Water" aired on the US talk show Late Night With Seth Meyers. Billboard magazine described the performance as an anti-capitalist anthem where "complacency is not an option".

Music video 
The music video for "Blood // Water" was released on June 4, 2018 to coincide with the announcement of his debut extended play, A Modern Tragedy Vol. 1. Alex Darus of Alternative Press described the music video as "[referencing the] 1950s nuclear family idea and [juxtaposing] them with images of politicians profiting off problems such as prescription drug abuse."

Track listing

Charts

Weekly charts

Year-end charts

Certifications

See also
Nuclear family

References

External links 

2017 singles
2017 songs
Grandson (musician) songs
Atlantic Records singles